Dukem (var. Dukam, Duukam) is a town in central Oromia Region, Ethiopia. It is the administrative center of Akaki Aanaa.

Dukem is situated along the Addis Ababa–Adama Expressway and is a station on the Ethio-Djibouti Railway. It is also the location of an industrial park covering 40 hectares owned and developed by East African Group (Ethiopia), Ltd.

Based on figures from the Central Statistical Agency in 2005, Dukem has an estimated total population of 8,704 of whom 4,095 are men and 4,609 are women.

Notes

References 

Cities and towns in Oromia Region